Holy Holy are an Australian indie rock band formed by songwriters Timothy Carroll (vocals, guitar) and Oscar Dawson (guitar) in 2011. The pair were later joined by Ryan Strathie (drums), and by touring musicians Graham Ritchie (bass guitar) and Matt Redlich (keyboards, backing vocals). They have released four top-20 studio albums and have been nominated for two ARIA Award.

Band members
Current members
 Timothy Carroll – lead vocals, rhythm guitar 
 Oscar Dawson – lead guitar, keyboards, bass, production

Current touring musicians
 Ryan Strathie - drums, backing vocals
 Graham Ritchie – bass guitar 
 Lily Richardson – backing vocals
 Grace Richardson – backing vocals

Former touring musicians
 Matt Redlich – keyboards, backing vocals

History

2011–2013: Formation and The Pacific EP

Australian-born songwriters Timothy Carroll and Oscar Dawson initially met as volunteer English teachers in Southeast Asia. They reconnected in 2011 while Carroll was living in Stockholm. Dawson had moved to Berlin with his then-band, Dukes of Windsor. When Dawson visited in Sweden, Carroll asked him to assist with some songs, which later formed the basis for their debut extended play, The Pacific EP.

Holy Holy released their first single, "Impossible Like You", independently in May 2013 and the band played their first shows in capital cities of Australia. They signed to Sydney label, Wonderlick Entertainment in December 2013, and released The Pacific EP in March 2013. Meanwhile, Carroll enlisted drummer Ryan Strathie (ex-Hungry Kids of Hungary) and bass guitarist Graham Ritchie (ex-Emma Louise, Airling), to join the band. Producer Matt Redlich (of Ball Park Music, Emma Louise, the Trouble with Templeton), joined them as a guest touring musician on keyboards and backing vocals. The five-piece version of Holy Holy opened for Boy & Bear, the Preatures and Ball Park Music.

2014–2015: When the Storms Would Come

The band recorded their debut studio album, When the Storms Would Come, with producer Redlich. It was mostly recorded to 16-track 2-inch tape. The album was released in July 2015 and debuted at No. 11 on the ARIA Albums Chart. The album received positive reviews.

In July 2015, the band played sets at Splendour in the Grass in Byron Bay and Falls Festival and well as completing a twenty-date Australian tour and European dates in the UK and The Netherlands. Artrocker magazine in the UK hailed Holy Holy in their top 6 bands at The Great Escape in 2015, saying "will probably soon take over all of the universe with their wholesome psychedelic take on alt-rock, alt-country, dusty roads and beards".

2016–2017: Paint

Straight off the back of a relentless touring schedule and festival appearances for When the Storms Would Come, Holy Holy announced they were back in the studio.

In August 2016, released "Darwinism", the lead single from their second studio album. The name was said to tie in with the theme of evolution, with Darwinism meaning 'evolution of species by natural selection advanced by Charles Darwin'. They released the single "Elevator" in November 2016 and the album Paint was released in February 2017 and peaked at No. 11 on the ARIA Albums Chart.  During the week of album release, Holy Holy released numerous videos for different songs from the LP - artists' interpretations of the songs; as part of a mini art series called Painting to Paint. The project was headed by Australian artist James Drinkwater.

2018–2019: My Own Pool of Light

In September 2018, Holy Holy released a new single entitled "Faces", and started an Australian national tour. Their third album, My Own Pool of Light was released in August 2019 and peaked at number 14 on the ARIA Albums Chart. At the 2019 ARIA Music Awards, it was nominated for Best Rock Album.

2020–2022: Hello My Beautiful World

On 17 June 2021, the band announced their fourth studio album Hello My Beautiful World. The album's third single, "Believe Anything", was released alongside the album's announcement. The album debuted at number 4 on the ARIA Albums Chart, achieving their highest chart peak.

2023: fifth studio album
On 3 March 2022, Holy Holy released "Messed Up" featuring Kwame; the lead single from their forthcoming fifth studio album.

Discography

Studio albums

Extended plays

Singles

As lead artists

As featured artists

Awards and nominations

ARIA Music Awards
The ARIA Music Awards is an annual awards ceremony that recognises excellence, innovation, and achievement across all genres of Australian music. Holy Holy have received two nominations.

! 
|-
! scope="row"| 2019
| My Own Pool of Light
| ARIA Award for Best Rock Album
| 
| 
|-
! scope="row"| 2021
| Hello My Beautiful World
| Best Rock Album
| 
| 
|}

Environmental Music Prize
The Environmental Music Prize is a quest to find a theme song to inspire action on climate and conservation. It commenced in 2022.

! 
|-
| rowspan="2"| 2022
| "Hello My Beautiful World"
| rowspan="2"| Environmental Music Prize
| 
| rowspan="2"| 
|-
| "Port Road"
| 
|-

J Awards
The J Awards are an annual series of Australian music awards that were established by the Australian Broadcasting Corporation's youth-focused radio station Triple J. They commenced in 2005. Holy Holy have received one nomination.

! 
|-
! scope="row"| 2019
| My Own Pool of Light
| Australian Album of the Year
| 
| 
|-
! scope="row"| 2021
| Hello My Beautiful World
| Australian Album of the Year
| 
| 
|}

National Live Music Awards
The National Live Music Awards (NLMAs) are a broad recognition of Australia's diverse live industry, celebrating the success of the Australian live scene. The awards commenced in 2016. Holy Holy have received nominations in 2016, 2017, and 2020.

! 
|-
! scope="row"| 2016
| Themselves 
| International Live Achievement (Group)
| 
| 
|-
! scope="row"| 2017
| rowspan="2"| Oscar Dawson of Holy Holy
| Live Guitarist of the Year
| 
| 
|-
! scope="row"| 2020
| Live Guitarist of the Year
| 
| 
|}

Rolling Stone Australia Awards
The Rolling Stone Australia Awards are awarded annually in January or February by the Australian edition of Rolling Stone magazine for outstanding contributions to popular culture in the previous year.

! 
|-
| 2022
| Holy Holy
| Rolling Stone Readers' Choice Award
| 
|
|-

References

External links
 

2011 establishments in Australia
Australian indie pop groups
Australian indie rock groups
Musical groups established in 2011
Sony Music Australia artists